Shirley Cloete  (born 13 January 1982) is a Namibian women's international footballer who plays as a midfielder. She is a member of the Namibia women's national football team. She was part of the team at the 2014 African Women's Championship. On club level she played for Okahandja Beauties FC in Namibia.

References

External links
 CAF player profile

1982 births
Living people
Namibian women's footballers
Namibia women's international footballers
Place of birth missing (living people)
Women's association football midfielders